Softwood Music Under Slow Pillars (or simply Softwood Music) is the seventh album of Sielun Veljet, released in 1989. It is the band's only English language album released as Sielun Veljet, although it was released in Sweden as L'amourder. The band had already released two English language recordings, the Ritual EP in 1986 and Shit-Hot in 1987, consisting of re-recorded versions of their songs with the lyrics translated to English, but this was the first time that the music was originally written in English.

Sielun Veljet had already been exploring foreign markets and even toured in Europe and the Soviet Union in 1987, but Softwood Music was only released in Finland and Sweden, and even there it sold poorly. It differs from previous Sielun Veljet albums by being acoustic and containing influences from Indian music to flamenco. The album has a generally psychedelic atmosphere.

The album's cover art was painted by Peruvian artist Pablo Amaringo. It depicts a shamanistic ayahuasca healing ritual.

Track listing 
Music and lyrics by Sielun Veljet.
 "Mushroom Moon"—3:23
 "I Wanna Be a Frog"—2:16
 "Life Is a Cobra"—3:05
 "Woe! The Maiden of My Heart"—2:19
 "Immortal Bliss"—2:51
 "Evil Kübl"—3:38
 "Vicious Waltz"—2:45
 "Hey-Ho, Red Banana!"—1:58
 "The Beast Has Taken Over in My Mind Again"—4:27
 "Old Masterpiece"—2:02
 "Kerala"—4:25
 "Living in a Twisted World"—3:10

Personnel 
 Ismo Alanko -- vocals, steel-string guitar, bouzouki, cello, backing vocals
 Jukka Orma -- nylon-string guitar, vocals, backing vocals
 Jouko Hohko -- bass balalaika, vocals, backing vocals
 Alf Forsman -- gongo-drums, big drum, gunguru-klocks & other percussion
 Karri Koivukoski -- viola
 Jaakko Vuornos -- violin
 Salla Salmenkallio -- violin

Notes 

1989 albums
Sielun Veljet albums